Kwasi Poku (born February 6, 2003) is a Canadian soccer player who currently plays for Forge FC.

Early life
Poku began playing youth soccer at age six with Brampton East SC. He later played youth soccer with the Woodbridge Strikers, with whom he won the 2017 U14 Ontario Indoor Cup, scoring a hat-trick against Ottawa St. Anthony. He was also part of the provincial Team Ontario that year. He later played for Unionville Milliken SC. He later joined the Toronto FC Academy.

Club career
In 2021, he played with Toronto FC III in the League1 Ontario Summer Championship division making his debut on July 31 against Alliance United. After the season, he joined the second team Toronto FC II in USL League One. He made his debut on October 1, 2021 against North Carolina FC.

In February 2022, he signed a professional contract with Canadian Premier League side Forge FC. He made his debut for his new club on February 16 in a 2022 CONCACAF Champions League  match against Cruz Azul. Poku scored his first goal on October 9, 2022 in a 1-0 victory over HFX Wanderers FC. In January 2023, Poku went on trial with Swedish Allsvenskan club BK Häcken.

International career
Born in Canada, Poku is of Ghanaian descent. In April 2022, he was called up to the Canadian Under-20 team for two matches against Costa Rica. In June 2022, he was named to the Canadian U-20 team for the 2022 CONCACAF U-20 Championship.

Career statistics

References

External links

2003 births
Living people
Canadian soccer players
Canadian people of Ghanaian descent
Soccer players from Brampton
Association football midfielders
Toronto FC players
League1 Ontario players
Toronto FC II players
USL League One players
Woodbridge Strikers players
Unionville Milliken SC players
Forge FC players
Canadian Premier League players
Canada men's youth international soccer players